(On Christian Doctrine) is a theological treatise of the English poet and thinker John Milton (1608–1674), containing a systematic exposition of his religious views. The Latin manuscript  was found in 1823 and published in 1825. The authorship of the work is debatable. In favor of the theory of the non-authenticity of the text, comments are made both over its content (it contradicts the ideas of his other works, primarily the poems "Paradise Lost" and "Paradise Regained"), as well as since it is hard to imagine that such a complex text could be written by a blind person (Milton was blind by the time of the work's creation, thus it is now assumed that an amanuensis aided the author.) However, after nearly a century of interdisciplinary research, it is generally accepted that the manuscript belongs to Milton. The course of work on the manuscript, its fate after the death of the author, and the reasons for which it was not published during his lifetime are well established.

The history and style of Christian Doctrine have created much controversy. Critics have argued about the authority of the text as representative of Milton's philosophy based on possible problems with its authorship, its production, and over what its content actually means. As Lieb has shown "...

The work has been translated into English three times: by Charles R. Sumner in 1825, by John Carey in 1973, and by John K. Hale and J. Donald Cullington in 2012.

Background
The only manuscript of Christian Doctrine was found during 1823 in London's Old State Paper Office (at the Middle Treasury Gallery in Whitehall). The work was one of many in a bundle of state papers written by John Milton while he served as Secretary of Foreign Tongues under Oliver Cromwell. The manuscript was provided with a prefatory epistle that explains the background and history to the formation of the work. If it is genuine, the manuscript is the same work referred to in Milton's Commonplace Book and in an account by Edward Phillips, Milton's nephew, of a theological "tractate".

Picard first copied the manuscript from previous works and Skinner prepared the work to be copied for typesetting, although there are a few unidentified editors who made changes to the manuscript. After Milton died in 1674, Daniel Skinner was given Christian Doctrine along with Milton's other manuscripts. In 1675, Skinner attempted to publish the work in Amsterdam, but it was rejected, and in 1677 he was pressured by the English government to hand over the document upon which it was then hidden.

The first was by Charles R. Sumner in 1825, titled A Treatise on Christian Doctrine Compiled from the Holy Scriptures Alone. The original Latin text was not included (it was published in a separate volume), but it was added on the facing page when the Sumner translation was reprinted in Volumes 14-17 of Columbia's The Works of John Milton in 1933-4. The second translation, by John Carey in 1973, was not in a dual language format and was printed in Volume 6 of Yale's Complete Prose Works of John Milton. The third and latest translation, a collaborative work between John K. Hale and J. Donald Cullington published in 2012 as Volume 8 of Oxford's The Complete Works of John Milton, works from a new transcription of the original manuscript, and publishes the Latin and English translation in a facing-page format. All three of these translations identify Milton as the author.

There is a minority line of criticism that denies Christian Doctrine as a work produced by Milton, but these critics have suggested no authors in place of Milton. These denials are grounded in the assumptions that a blind Milton would struggle to rely on so many Biblical quotations and that the Christian Doctrine is the sole reason why Milton is viewed as having a heterodox theological understanding. In response to this argument, many critics have focused on defending Milton's authorship e.g. Lewalski and Fallon. The argument also fails to account for the high Biblical literacy of the time. Currently many scholars support Miltonic authorship of the piece, and most editions of Milton's prose include the work.

Manuscript
The Christian Doctrine is divided into two books. The first book is then divided into 33 chapters and the second into 17.

The first part of the work appears to be "finished" because it is free of edits and the handwriting (Skinner's) is neat, whereas the second is filled with edits, corrections, and notes in the margins. Skinner's incomplete fair copy has stirred controversy over the work, because it does not provide critics with the ability to determine what the fair copy was based on.

The manuscript itself is patterned on the theological treatises common to Milton's time, such as William Ames's  and John Wolleb's . Although Milton refers to "forty-two works", of these many were what he called "systematic theologies" in his various works. Christian Doctrine does not allude to them in the same way as Milton's political treatises. However, the actual pattern of discourse found within the treatise is modeled after Ames's and Wolleb's works even if the content is different.

Where Milton differs is in the use of scripture as evidence. Milton relies on scripture as the basis of his argument and keeps scripture in the center of his text, whereas many other theological treatises keep scriptural passages to the margins. In essence, as Lieb says, "Milton privileges the proof-text over that which is to be proven." Schwartz has gone so far as to claim that Milton "ransacked the whole Bible" and that Milton's own words are "squeezed out of his text." However, the actual "proof-texts" of the Bible are various: no single version is used in Milton's Latin citations.

Theology
Milton's approach to theology is to deal directly with the Bible and use "the word of God" as his basis. Even though Milton relied on the pattern of "theological systems" of his day, he believed that there could be "progress" achieved in understanding theology by relying on the Bible completely. Milton "filled" his theology with direct quotations from the Bible in order to separate his work from his contemporaries who did not deal with the Bible enough for his taste. Some critics have argued that Milton's theology is Arian.

Christian Doctrine
The first chapter of Christian Doctrine discusses the actual meaning of "Christian Doctrine." Milton claims that this "Christian Doctrine" needs to be understood before one can begin to talk about divinity and that the doctrine comes from Christ's communication to mankind about divinity. The doctrine requires humans to "come to terms with God's nature" and it comes from "the ever-abiding desire to celebrate [God's] glory because of his redemptive plan."

Milton's approach to Christian doctrine is not philosophical, and Milton does not attempt at "knowing" God. Instead, we have to find God "in the Holy Scriptures alone and with the Holy Spirit as guide." Milton grounds his message in Christian teaching when he says:

As such, Milton promotes the idea that his whole work comes only from the teachings of Christ, and that Christian doctrine can only come from Christ.

Milton's God
Milton's God is an "over-whelming force" that, in some of Milton's works, appears "as the embodiment of dread." Along with this, God is not definable, but some of his aspects are knowable: he is one, omnipresent, and eternal.

Milton's interpretation of God has been described as Arian. In particular, Christian Doctrine denies the eternity of the Son, Jesus's pre-birth title. Such a denial separates the unity between God and the Son. However, some claim that Milton did believe that the Son is eternal, since he was begotten before time, and that he represents part of the Logos. But this cannot be, as Kelley points out, "Milton concludes, the Son was begotten not from eternity but 'within the limits of time.'" Although some have argued that the Son is equal in some respects with God, the Son lacks the complete attributes of God.

Another aspect of Milton's God is that he is material. This is not to say that he has a human form, as Milton states, "God in his most simple nature is a SPIRIT." However, such "spirits" to Milton, as with many of his contemporaries like Thomas Hobbes, are a type of material. God, from his material essence, is able to establish all other matter and then manipulate that matter to create forms and beings.

Critical response
In the mid 20th century, C. A. Patrides declared Christian Doctrine as a "theological labyrinth" and as "an abortive venture into theology." The style of organisation has been identified as (in large part) Ramist, or at least compatible with the elaborate charting by Ramean trees common in some of the systematic and scholastic Calvinist theologies of the early seventeenth century.

Notes

References
 Bauman, Michael. Milton's Arianism. Peter Lang. 1987.
 Campbell, Gordon; Corns, Thomas N.; Hale, John K.; Holmes, David; and Tweedie, Fiona. "The Provenance of De Doctrina Christiana", Milton Quarterly 31 (1997) pp. 67–117
 ---- Milton and the Manuscript of De Doctrina Christiana Oxford: Oxford University Press. 2008. 240 pp.
 Campbell, Gordon. "The Son of God in De Doctrina Christiana and Paradise Lost" The Modern Language Review, Vol. 75, No. 3 (Jul. 1980), pp. 507–514
 Falcone, F. (2010). More challenges to Milton's authorship of De doctrina Christiana. Acme: annali della Facoltà di lettere e filosofia dell'Università degli studi di Milano, 63(1), 231–250.
 Fallon, Stephen. "Milton's Arminianism and the Authorship of De Doctrina Christiana" Texas Studies in Literature and Language 41, No. 2 (1999), pp. 103–127
 Hunter, William B. "The Provenance of the Christian Doctrine". SEL: Studies in English Literature 1500–1900, Vol. 32, No. 1, The English Renaissance (Winter, 1992), pp. 129–142
 Kelley, Maurice. This Great Argument. Gloucester, Mass.: P. Smith, 1962.
 ---- "Milton and the Trinity" The Huntington Library Quarterly, Vol. 33, No. 4 (Aug. 1970), pp. 315–320
 Lewalski, Barbara. "Milton and De Doctrina Christiana: Evidences of Authorship", Milton Studies 36 (1998), pp. 203–228
 Lieb, Michael. Theological Milton: Deity, Discourse and Heresy in the Miltonic Canon. Pittsburg: Duquesne University Press. 2006. 348 pp.
 ---- "De Doctrina Christiana and the Question of Authorship", Milton Studies 41 (2002) pp. 172–230
 Milton, John. The Complete Poetry and Essential Prose ed. William Kerrigan, John Rumrich, and Stephen Fallon. New York: The Modern Library. 2007. 1365 pp.
 ---- The Complete Prose Works of John Milton. Vol 6. Christian Doctrine ed. Maurice Kelley. New Haven: Yale University Press. 1953–1982.
 ---- A treatise on Christian doctrine compiled from the Holy Scriptures alone trans. Charles Richard Sumner. Cambridge: J. Smith. 1825.
 ---- Christian Doctrine. Vol. VI, Complete Prose Works of John Milton. Ed. Maurice Kelley, trans. John Carey. New Haven: Yale University Press. 1973.
 Patrides, C. A. "Paradise Lost and the Language of Theology", Language and Style in Milton: A Symposium in Honor of the Tercentenary of "Paradise Lost", ed. Ronald David Emma and John T. Shawcross. New York: Frederick Unger. 1967.
 Reesing, John "The Materiality of God in Milton's De Doctrina Christiana" The Harvard Theological Review, Vol. 50, No. 3 (Jul. 1957), pp. 159–173
 Schwartz, Regina M. "Citation, Authority, and De Doctrina Christiana", in Politics, Poetics, and Hermeneutics in Milton's Prose ed. David Loewenstein and James Turner. Cambridge: Cambridge University Press. 1990

Further reading
 Patrides, C. A. Milton and the Christian Tradition (Oxford, 1966) 
 Patrides, C. A. Bright Essence: Studies in Milton's Theology (University of Utah, 1971) 
 Patrides, C. A. Selected Prose by John Milton (University of Missouri, 1985)

External links
De Doctrina Christiana
A Treatise on Christian Doctrine

17th-century Christian texts
17th-century manuscripts
1823 archaeological discoveries
1825 non-fiction books
Archaeological discoveries in the United Kingdom
Books published posthumously
Nontrinitarianism
Christian theology books
English non-fiction literature
New Latin literature
Books by John Milton
Treatises
17th-century Latin books
19th-century Latin books
Works of uncertain authorship